The 2000 Grand Prix was a professional snooker tournament and the second of eight WPBSA ranking events in the 2000/2001 season, following the British Open and preceding the UK Championship. It was held from 13 to 22 October 2000 at the Telford International Centre in Telford, England.

John Higgins was the defending champion, but he withdrew from his quarter-final match against Graeme Dott. Mark Williams won his 10th ranking title by defeating Ronnie O'Sullivan 9–5 in the final.

Tournament summary 

Defending champion John Higgins was the number 1 seed with World Champion Mark Williams seeded 2. The remaining places were allocated to players based on the world rankings.

Despite reaching the quarter-finals, Higgins withdrew from the tournament at the quarter-final stage, giving opponent Graeme Dott a walkover into the semi-finals. Higgins was angry that his quarter-final match with Dott was to fall on the same day as his brother's wedding, despite Higgins' claim he had been assured eight months previously no such clash was to take place. World Snooker insisted no such assurances were made.

Main draw

Final

References

http://www.snooker.org/trn/0001/gp2000_res.shtml

World Open (snooker)
Grand Prix